Boy toy may refer to:

 Boys' toys and games
 Boy Toy (novel), a 2007 novel by Barry Lyga
 Boy Toy (film), a 2011 film starring John White
 Boy Toy/Inspection Detection, an episode of the TV show The Fairly OddParents
 A belt worn by Madonna, originally on a wedding dress for the 1984 album cover of Like a Virgin
 Boy Toy Inc., a subsidiary of Semtex Girls, a production company owned by Madonna
 The name of a fashion collection by Jean Paul Gaultier

See also 
 Toyboy or toy boy, a man significantly younger than his partner